Rick Dalpos (born April 25, 1957) is an American professional golfer who played on the PGA Tour and the Nationwide Tour.

Dalpos joined the PGA Tour in 1983 and played on Tour until 1989 with little success. His best finish during those years was when he finished in a tie for tenth in the 1987 Los Angeles Open. He joined the Nationwide Tour in 1990 and enjoyed more success, recording four top-10 finishes.

In 1991, he picked up his first win on Tour at the Ben Hogan Greater Ozarks Open. He picked up his second win the following year at the Ben Hogan Pensacola Open. That win helped him finish 8th on the money list which earned him his PGA Tour card for 1993. He struggled on Tour and then played sporadically on the Nationwide Tour for three years. He has attempted to qualifying for the Champions Tour but has been unsuccessful.

Professional wins (5)

Ben Hogan Tour wins (2)

Other wins (3)
1990 Illinois PGA Championship
1991 Illinois PGA Championship
1995 Illinois Open Championship

Results in major championships

CUT = missed the half-way cut
Note: Dalpos only played in the U.S. Open.

See also
1982 PGA Tour Qualifying School graduates
1983 PGA Tour Qualifying School graduates
1985 PGA Tour Qualifying School graduates
1986 PGA Tour Qualifying School graduates
1988 PGA Tour Qualifying School graduates
1992 Ben Hogan Tour graduates

External links

American male golfers
Purdue Boilermakers men's golfers
PGA Tour golfers
Korn Ferry Tour graduates
Golfers from Illinois
Sportspeople from Joliet, Illinois
1957 births
Living people